Peter Stewart Bevan-Baker (born 3 June 1962) is a Scottish-Canadian politician, currently the leader of the Green Party of Prince Edward Island and a member of the Legislative Assembly of Prince Edward Island representing New Haven-Rocky Point (formerly representing Kellys Cross-Cumberland.) He previously stood as a candidate for both the Green Party of Ontario and the Green Party of Canada. Bevan-Baker is a dentist by profession as well as being an active writer, musician and public speaker. As a result of the 2019 election, Bevan-Baker is the current Leader of the Official Opposition in the 66th General Assembly of Prince Edward Island.

Personal life
He is the second child of composer John Bevan Baker and June Findlay. He holds a Bachelor of Dental Surgery degree from the University of Glasgow. In 1985 he emigrated to Canada, living first in Lewisporte, Newfoundland and then Brockville, Ontario before settling in Prince Edward Island in 2003. He became a Canadian citizen in 1992.

Political career
Bevan-Baker joined the Green Party of Canada in 1992, and has run as a candidate for the House of Commons of Canada in the elections of 1993, 1997 in the riding of Leeds—Grenville and provincially in 1995 in the riding of Leeds-Grenville in Ontario, and 2008 and 2011 in Malpeque, PEI.

In 1997, he ran on a platform that advocated establishing a Genuine Progress Index (GPI). This was proposed to replace the Gross Domestic Product (GDP) as the standard measure for assessing national progress with an index that gauged the health and well-being of people, communities and eco-systems. Though not elected from 1997 to 2001, he forged an alliance with Liberal MP Joe Jordan to draft the Canada Well-Being Measurement Bill (C-268), which incorporated many of the central tenets of the GPI. The bill received first reading on 14 February 2001, but did not become law.

Bevan-Baker has also run three times as a candidate in provincial elections in Ontario, and on Prince Edward Island in the riding of Kelly's Cross-Cumberland in 2007 and 2011.

In 2012 he spearheaded a coalition from a broad spectrum of Islanders against a project known as "Plan B", which involved rerouting a portion of the Trans Canada Highway through a section of ancient Acadian forest, citing negative environmental and fiscal implications for the province.
In 2015, Bevan-Baker was elected to the Prince Edward Island Legislative Assembly with 54% of the vote, winning the first-ever seat for the Green Party of Prince Edward Island. It was his tenth attempt at winning a seat. He is the third member of a provincial Green Party to win a seat in a provincial legislature in Canada, following Andrew Weaver in British Columbia and David Coon in New Brunswick.

In 2019 the Green Party under Bevan-Baker's leadership witnessed the best electoral performance of any Green Party in Canada, finishing with enough seats to form the Official Opposition, marking the first time that the Green Party has formed the Official Opposition at any level in Canadian history.

Electoral history

References

External links

1962 births
Alumni of the University of Glasgow
Canadian dentists
Green Party of Ontario candidates in Ontario provincial elections
Green Party of Prince Edward Island MLAs
Leaders of the Green Party of Prince Edward Island
Living people
Ontario candidates for Member of Parliament
Politicians from Aberdeen
Prince Edward Island candidates for Member of Parliament
Scottish emigrants to Canada
21st-century Canadian politicians
Naturalized citizens of Canada